The Tennis Courts are courts located at Olympiapark Berlin in Berlin, Germany. Located southwest of the Olympic Stadium, they hosted the basketball and the Épée fencing event for the 1936 Summer Olympics.

References
1936 Summer Olympics official report. Volume 1. pp. 162–3.

Venues of the 1936 Summer Olympics
Olympic basketball venues
Olympic fencing venues
Sports venues in Berlin
Tennis venues in Germany